East Fife was a county constituency represented in the House of Commons of the Parliament of the United Kingdom from 1885 to 1983. Along with West Fife, it was formed by splitting the old Fife constituency.

It elected one Member of Parliament using the first-past-the-post voting system, and from 1886 to 1918 it was represented by the Liberal Prime Minister (1908–16), H. H. Asquith.

Boundaries 

In 1885, the constituency comprised the parishes of Abdie, Abernethy, Anstruther Wester, Anstruther Easter, Auchtermuchty, Balmerino, Cameron, Carnbee, Ceres, Collessie, Crail, Creich, Cults, Cupar, Dairsie, Dunbog, Dunino, Elie, Falkland, Ferry-Port-on-Craig, Flisk, Forgan, Kemback, Kennoway, Kettle, Kilconquhar, Kilmany, Kilrenny, Kingsbarns, Largo, Leuchars, Logie, Monimail, Moonzie, Newburgh, Newburn, Pittenweem, St Andrews, St Leonards, St Monance, Scoonie and Strathmiglo.

In 1918, on the dissolution of the St Andrews Burghs constituency, the burghs of St Andrews, Anstruther Easter, Anstruther Wester, Crail, Cupar, Kilrenny and Pittenweem were added to the constituency.
It then consisted of "The Cupar and St. Andrews County Districts, inclusive of all burghs situated therein, together with the burgh of Leven and so much of the Kirkcaldy County District as is contained within the extra-burghal portion of the parish of Scoonie and the parish of Kennoway."

Members of Parliament

Election results

Elections in the 1880s

Elections in the 1890s 

Asquith is appointed Secretary of State for the Home Department, requiring a by-election.

Elections in the 1900s

Elections in the 1910s

Elections in the 1920s

Elections in the 1930s

Elections in the 1940s

Elections in the 1950s

Elections in the 1960s

Elections in the 1970s

References

Sources 

Election results, 1950 - 1970
F. W. S. Craig, British Parliamentary Election Results 1974 - 1983
F. W. S. Craig, British Parliamentary Election Results 1918 - 1949
F. W. S. Craig, British Parliamentary Election Results 1885 - 1918

See also 
 North East Fife Constituency

Historic parliamentary constituencies in Scotland (Westminster)
Constituencies of the Parliament of the United Kingdom established in 1885
Constituencies of the Parliament of the United Kingdom disestablished in 1983
Constituencies of the Parliament of the United Kingdom represented by a sitting Prime Minister